Sunrise Park Resort is an alpine ski resort located near Greer, Arizona. The resort consists of three mountains named Sunrise Peak, Cyclone Circle, and Apache Peak. Situated on the Colorado Plateau and perched atop the White Mountains in eastern Arizona. The ski slopes spread across the 3 peaks and cover , making it the largest ski resort in Arizona.

Ownership and location
Sunrise Park Resort is owned and operated by the White Mountain Apache Tribe, and is located on the Fort Apache Indian Reservation.  The resort is a year-round recreation destination and offers a wide range of outdoor activities.

The closest airports are located in Springerville, Arizona, Show Low, Arizona, and Whiteriver, Arizona.

Climate

According to the Köppen Climate Classification system, Sunrise Park Resort has a warm-summer mediterranean continental climate, abbreviated "Dsb" on climate maps.

Winter 
The ski season at Sunrise Park Resort usually runs from Thanksgiving through the end of March.  During the winter, the resort's three mountains offer alpine skiing. Night skiing is offered around Christmas and on holiday weekends in January and February.  There is also a snowboard terrain park, separate cross-country skiing area, and a snow tubing hill.

Ski bikes 
Ski biking (also known as Skibobbing) is a bicycle-like frame with skis instead of wheels. The sport is offered for beginners and experienced individuals at Sunrise.  They offer both lessons and rentals for ski biking and the lift system allows for ski bikers to ride the lift up the mountain. First-time ski bike riders at Sunrise require a safety certification by the ski bike staff prior to loading the lifts, regardless of their experience or personal equipment to ensure the safety of themselves and other visitors.

Lessons and rentals 
Sunrise offers rentals of skis, snowboards, boots, poles, and winter clothing for all sizes and all ages at the rental shop at the base of Sunrise Peak.  Ski School is offered for all ages and allows first-time skiers or snowboarders to learn in a group setting or one-on-one with an instructor. Some lessons are offered for a half-day and others are an entire day. Sunrise also offers improvement lessons for experienced skiers or snowboarders to improve their skills.

Mountain statistics

Elevation
The ski area consists of three peaks:
 Sunrise Peak (elevation 10,700')
 Apache Peak (elevation 11,000')
 Base: 
 Summit: 
 Vertical drop: 1,800 feet (2nd highest in Arizona)
 Cyclone Circle (elevation 10,700')

Trails
The trails on the mountain have some sort of theme, such as Native American and Western names.
 Skiable area: 
 67 trails
  Beginner – 31 trails (46%)
  Intermediate – 19 trails (28%)
  Advanced/Expert – 14 trails (21%)
  Advanced/Expert – 3 trails (4%)
 Longest trail – "Lonestar"

Lifts

 8 Total operational lifts
 1 High-Speed Quad Chairs
 2 Fixed Quad Chairs
 2 Fixed Triple Chairs
 1 Fixed Double Chairs
 2 Surface lifts
 Uphill Capacity – 16,000 skiers per hour

Summer 
The summer season at Sunrise Park Resort usually runs from Memorial Day weekend through September or October, depending on weather and other factors. Sunrise offers several summer activities, including downhill mountain biking, scenic chairlift rides, a zip line course, a tubing hill, a rock climbing wall, hiking, and 3D archery.

Mountain bike trails 
There are 22 mountain bike trails, and an array of side trails. The trail system is primarily located on Sunrise Peak, with one trail (Ba'cho) traveling over to Apache Peak and Cyclone Circle. All trails converge at the base of Sunrise Peak, where riders can load on the Sunrise Express (Lift 1, high-speed quad) or the Spirit Ridge (Lift 8, fixed grip quad lift) to access the trails.
  Easy – 6 trails (27%)
  Intermediate – 3 trails (14%)
  Difficult – 8 trails (36%)
   Expert – 5 trails (23%)

Images

Winter Images

Summer Images

Trivia
 Sunrise Park Resort is Arizona's largest ski resort and Summer outdoor adventure park.
 Sunrise Park Resort has been in operation since 1970.
 One of Arizona's highest peaks, Mount Baldy, can be seen from Sunrise.
 Sunrise Park Resort currently offers the only lift-served downhill mountain biking available in Arizona.
 Sunrise Park Resort is home to Arizona's longest zip line with their tandem Apache High Flyer, measuring over 2300'.

See also
 Arizona Snowbowl
 Mount Lemmon Ski Valley
 List of mountains and hills of Arizona by height

References

External links

 Sunrise Park Resort official website
 Trail map
 Sunrise base live webcam

Ski areas and resorts in Arizona
White Mountains (Arizona)
Buildings and structures in Apache County, Arizona
Tourist attractions in Apache County, Arizona
White Mountain Apache Tribe